The Independence Day of Mongolia is the main state holiday in Mongolia. This date is celebrated annually on 29 December. It marks Mongolia's independence from Qing China in 1911. It has been celebrated annually in Mongolia since 2011. Independence Day is also the term used for Constitution Day on November 26.

Background 
In 1911, the Xinhai Revolution broke out and Outer Mongolia declared its independence on December 29, 1911. The newly established Bogd Khanate of Mongolia led by the Bogd Khan lasted for 8 years until it was occupied by the Republic of China in 1919, but regained its independence on 11 July 1921.

See also 
Mongolia under Qing rule
Public holidays in Mongolia
Mongolian State Flag Day

References 

Mongolia
December observances
Public holidays in Mongolia